The Brilliance V3 is a subcompact crossover SUV produced by Brilliance Auto under the Zhonghua brand. The V3 crossover shares the same platform with the Brilliance H220, and It debuted on the 2015 Shanghai Auto Show and was launched in the Chinese market in May 2015 and has been the best-selling Brilliance ever since. Prices starts from 67,500 yuan to 117,700 yuan.

2017 facelift
The facelifted V3 was launched on the Chinese auto market in Q2 2017. The facelift mainly updates the front DRG to be in line with other Brilliance Zhonghua crossover products with the chrome grilles and headlamps connecting with each other, and on the rear, the most obvious styling updates are the redesigned L-shaped tail lamps. With the pre-facelift 112hp 1.5L and a 150hp 1.5L turbo engines to continue in the facelifted car.

References

External links 

 Brilliance V3 Official

V3
Mini sport utility vehicles
Front-wheel-drive vehicles
Cars introduced in 2015
Crossover sport utility vehicles
Cars of China